Mark Ridley may refer to:

 Mark Ridley (physician) (1560–1624), English physician and mathematician
 Mark Ridley (zoologist) (born 1956), English zoologist

See also
 Mark Ridley-Thomas (born 1954), Californian politician